Toma Zamfir (9 March 1954 - 12 July 2015) was a Romanian footballer who played as a forward.

Honours
Dinamo București
 Divizia A: 1974–75

References

1954 births
2015 deaths
Romanian footballers
Association football forwards
Liga I players
Liga II players
FC Dinamo București players
FCM Bacău players
AFC Rocar București players